Matteo Meneghello (born 8 June 1981 in Abano Terme) is an Italian racing driver.

Career
Former kart rival of Fernando Alonso, Matteo competed in karting championships from 1991 to 2000. He led the final starting of the World Championship in 1995 and he was second at the finish line in front of Fernando Alonso and behind Andre’ Lotterer. After  karting, Meneghello competed in Italian Formula Renault Elf Campus. Then he moved to the Italian Formula 3 Federale in 2001. He moved to the Formula Renault 2000 Italy in 2002 with a fifth place best result in Pergusa Gp for 2003. In 2004, he moved up to the Formula Renault V6 Eurocup

Meneghello also competed One race in both the Euro and FIA Formula 3000 series in 2004, but was limited to only one race in each.

Meneghello has competed in the Formula Renault 3.5 Series in 2005 half Championship and 2006 for four races. He was sixth in Monza at the last race.

In 2007 Meneghello moved up to Gt in a Peroni race with a Dodge Viper in couple With Andrea Pellizzato .

In 2008 and 2009 Meneghello took part at few races of Italian Gt championship with two podium (third position) like best results with a Porsche Gt3 cup in couple With gentleman driver Riccardo Bianco.

In 2010 Meneghello made his only race  in the Superstars International Series with a Jaguar XF at Hockenheim ring. He was in eighth position during the first race but engine problem stopped his race before the end. He was limited to only one race.

In 2015 he drove a Tatuus Mugen in VdeV series with gentleman driver Vito Rinaldi

Racing record

Career summary

Complete International Formula 3000 results
(key) (Races in bold indicate pole position; races in italics indicate fastest lap.)

Complete Formula Renault 3.5 Series results 
(key) (Races in bold indicate pole position) (Races in italics indicate fastest lap)

† Driver did not finish the race, but was classified as he completed more than 90% of the race distance.

References

Matteo Meneghello career statistics at driverdb.com, retrieved 17 December 2006.

External links
Meneghello's official website.

1981 births
Living people
Italian racing drivers
Italian Formula Renault 2.0 drivers
British Formula Renault 2.0 drivers
Formula Renault V6 Eurocup drivers
Auto GP drivers
International Formula 3000 drivers
World Series Formula V8 3.5 drivers
Superstars Series drivers
EuroInternational drivers
Durango drivers
Motaworld Racing drivers